Villosa trabalis, the Cumberland bean pearly mussel, Cumberland bean, or purple bean, is a species of freshwater mussel, an aquatic bivalve mollusk in the family Unionidae.

This species is endemic to the United States. It can be found in Alabama, Kentucky, and Tennessee. Its natural habitat is rivers. It is threatened by habitat loss.

References

Molluscs of the United States
trabalis
Bivalves described in 1834
Taxonomy articles created by Polbot
Taxobox binomials not recognized by IUCN